Scoliostomatidae is an extinct family of Paleozoic fossil sea snails, marine gastropod mollusks.

This family is unassigned to superfamily. This family consists of two following subfamilies (according to the taxonomy of the Gastropoda by Bouchet & Rocroi, 2005):
 Scoliostomatinae Frýda, Blodgett & Lenz, 2002
 Mitchelliinae Frýda, Blodgett & Lenz, 2002

References 

Prehistoric gastropods